The synagogue of Guebwiller is a synagogue in Guebwiller, Haut-Rhin, France.

History 
A synagoga judeorum was mentioned in Guebwiller in 1333. The Jewish community of Guebwiller was wiped out by the 1349 Black Death pandemics. Forty Jews lived in Guebwiller in 1748, and the community developed until 1900. The current synagogue, located at 7, rue de l'Ancien-Hôpital, was built in 1872. It replaces an older building from the early 19th century, that had become too small. The synagogue was wrecked by the Nazis in 1940 and restored in 1957.

Guebwiller has been a rabbinate seat since 1910.

Now owned by an association, the synagogue was registered as a Historical Monument on July 16, 1984.

Architecture 
This two-story synagogue was designed by architect Auguste Hartmann in 1869 and built in 1872 in the Roman-Byzantine style of the 19th century. It has a nave, two aisles with six arcades. The nave is flanked with two turrets with pine corn representations. The two lateral walls of the nave have twelve window openings each; each aisle has five. The Western portal of the building has red and blue paintings.

A rose is represented on the oculus of the Torah ark.

References

Further reading 

 
 

Guebwiller
Monuments historiques of Haut-Rhin
Synagogues completed in 1872
1872 establishments in France
Synagogues destroyed by Nazi Germany
Byzantine Revival synagogues